Deibel is a German surname. Notable people with the name include:
 Art Deibel (1896–1984), American professional football player 
 August Deibel (1915–1951), Dutch pilot of the Royal Netherlands East Indies Army Air Force
 Ed Deibel, founder of Northern Ontario Party
 Laura Deibel (born 1956), Ex-wife of an American actor named Tim Allen

References 

German-language surnames